Jani Tuppurainen (born March 30, 1980) is a Finnish professional ice hockey forward who currently plays with Mikkelin Jukurit of the Liiga.

Playing career
Undrafted, Tuppurainen won the Finnish Championships on two occasions with JYP Jyväskylä. He has also played for the Finnish National ice hockey team in Euro Hockey Tour. 

On 14 April 2021, Tuppurainen extended his professional career, leaving JYP as a free agent and signing a one-year contract with fellow Liiga club, Mikkelin Jukurit.

International play
In 2012 after winning Finnish Championships in Jyväskylä, Tuppurainen was chosen to represent the Finland men's national ice hockey team in 2012 IIHF World Championship.

References

External links

1980 births
Living people
Chicago Freeze players
HC Donbass players
Färjestad BK players
Finnish ice hockey forwards
Hokki players
JYP Jyväskylä players
KalPa players
Oulun Kärpät players
Sportspeople from Oulu